Arne Otto Birger Mellnäs (Stockholm, 30 August 1933 - 22 November 2002) was a Swedish composer.

References

1933 births
2002 deaths
Swedish composers
Swedish male composers
Musicians from Stockholm
20th-century Swedish male musicians